Adrienne Stone  is an Australian legal academic specialising in the areas of constitutional law and constitutional theory, with particular expertise in freedom of expression.

Academic career 
As of 2020, Stone is a Redmond Barry Distinguished Professor at the University of Melbourne. She holds a Chair at Melbourne Law School, and is a director at the school's Centre for Comparative Constitutional Studies.

Additionally, she is the president of the International Association of Constitutional Law, and is an elected Fellow of the Academy of Social Sciences in Australia and the Australian Academy of Law.

Selected publications

 Open Minds: Academic Freedom and Freedom of Speech (2020) 
 Oxford Handbook on the Australian Constitution (2018) - Editor

References

External links 
 Academic papers

Year of birth missing (living people)
Living people
Australian legal scholars
Academic staff of the University of Melbourne
Fellows of the Academy of the Social Sciences in Australia